Marc Dionne (born January 25, 1989), better known by the ring name Stu Grayson, is a Canadian professional wrestler. He is currently signed to All Elite Wrestling (AEW), where he is a member of the Dark Order stable.

Formerly known as Stupefied or Player Dos, he regularly teamed with Evil Uno as the Super Smash Brothers for various independent promotions across North America, including Alpha-1 Wrestling, Capital City Championship Combat (C*4), and California-based Pro Wrestling Guerrilla (PWG). Together, they are former one-time Chikara Campeones de Parejas, one-time PWG World Tag Team Champions and winners of PWG's 2012 Dynamite Duumvirate Tag Team Title Tournament.

Professional wrestling career

International Wrestling Syndicate
Stupefied made his debut in the Canadian wrestling promotion International Wrestling Syndicate (IWS). He quickly found a tag team partner in Player Uno as the Super Smash Brothers. The team found success as they soon won the IWS Tag Team Championship. He remained with the promotion until it folded on October 9, 2010.

Chikara (2007–2010)

Stupefied debuted in Chikara in 2007 as one half of the Super Smash Bros., for the November triple-shot weekend. Stupefied was brought back for King of Trios, and became a regular wrestler at the fed. The tag team became a fan favorite, however, they had trouble picking up wins. In August 2008 after Stupefied had repackaged himself as Player Dos, the Super Smash Bros. began a winning streak which would peak on September 21, 2008, during Chikara's debut in the Midwest, when the Super Smash Bros. ended the record-breaking reign of Incoherence (Delirious and Hallowicked), becoming the 4th Chikara Campeones de Parejas. However, their reign came to an abrupt end on October 19, 2008, at the hands of the Osirian Portal (Amasis and Ophidian) in only their first defense.

On August 16, 2009, Player Dos won the seventh annual Young Lions Cup, defeating Colin Delaney in the finals. He would lose the title to Tim Donst on January 31, 2010.

On October 24, 2010, Player Dos teamed with Player Uno and wrestled to date his last Chikara match with BDK members Sara Del Rey and Daizee Haze in a losing effort.

Ring of Honor (2009–2010)

On April 18, 2009, Dionne made his Ring of Honor debut as a replacement for the injured El Generico, under the ring name Generico Dos, in a six-man tag team match where he, Kevin Steen and Kenny Omega were defeated by Austin Aries, Rhett Titus and Kenny King. The Super Smash Brothers made their ROH debut as a team on May 8, 2009, at Never Say Die, losing to the team of Titus and King. On July 25 in Toronto, Ontario, at Death Before Dishonor VII Night 2 they scored an upset victory over former ROH World Tag Team Champions Kevin Steen and El Generico. On the November 9 episode of Ring of Honor Wrestling on HDNet, Dos and Uno debuted on the show in a return match, where they were defeated by Steen and Generico. On ROH Epic Encounter III Dos wrestled Kevin Steen in a losing effort. He had teamed with Uno on several HDNet episode wrestling teams like The American Wolves and The Kings of Wrestling. Since the Summer of 2010, Dos has not appeared in the company since.

Dragon Gate USA (2012)
On January 28, 2012, the Super Smash Bros. made their debut for Dragon Gate USA, defeating The Scene (Caleb Konley and Scott Reed) in a tag team match. The following day, they picked up another win over the D.U.F. (Arik Cannon and Pinkie Sanchez), after which Uno asked for a shot at the Open the United Gate Championship. The Super Smash Bros.' win streak ended on November 2, when they were defeated by Genki Horiguchi and Ryo Saito in an Open the United Gate Championship number one contenders' match.

Pro Wrestling Guerrilla (2011–2013, 2019)

On September 10, 2011, Stupefied debuted in Pro Wrestling Guerrilla (PWG) as a member of the Super Smash Bros. with Player Uno. In their debut match, they faced the RockNES Monsters (Johnny Goodtime and Johnny Yuma), a tag team with a similar video game-themed gimmick, in a losing effort. The Super Smash Bros. returned on December 10, 2011, this time losing a match against the American Wolves (Davey Richards and Eddie Edwards). The Super Smash Bros. picked up their first win in PWG on March 17, 2012, by defeating former two-time PWG World Tag Team Champions, The Young Bucks (Matt and Nick Jackson), and the RockNES Monsters in a three-way match. On April 21, the Super Smash Bros. defeated The Young Bucks in the opening round, Future Shock (Adam Cole and Kyle O'Reilly) in the semifinal, and 2 Husky Black Guys (El Generico and Willie Mack) in the final round to win the 2012 Dynamite Duumvirate Tag Team Title Tournament and become number one contenders to the PWG World Tag Team Championship.

On May 25, the Super Smash Bros. defeated The Young Bucks in a No Disqualification match to win the vacant PWG World Tag Team Championship. The Super Smash Bros. made their first successful title defense on July 21 at Threemendous III, PWG's nine-year anniversary event, where they defeated Future Shock and The Young Bucks in a three-way ladder match. On December 1 at Mystery Vortex, the Super Smash Bros. made their second successful World Tag Team Championship defense against the RockNES Monsters. Later that same event, they were defeated by the Dojo Bros (Eddie Edwards and Roderick Strong) in a non-title match. On January 12, 2013, the Super Smash Bros. lost the World Tag Team Championship to the Unbreakable F'n Machines (Brian Cage and Michael Elgin) in the opening round of the 2013 Dynamite Duumvirate Tag Team Title Tournament.

All Elite Wrestling (2019–2022, 2023–present)
Stu Grayson and Evil Uno made their surprise debut as The Dark Order at AEW Double or Nothing on May 25, 2019, appearing at the conclusion of the match between Best Friends and Angélico and Jack Evans. After the match was over, the lights went out and when they came back on, Grayson and Uno were in the ring. The lights went out a second time and when they came back on, masked henchmen surrounded the ring. The Order then attacked all four men. After the attack, the lights went out again and they disappeared. On May 2, 2022, it was announced that Grayson's contract had expired, as both sides had failed to reach an agreement for a re-signing. On October 14th episode of Rampage Stu made a cameo in a backstage segment with the Dark Order stating that they couldn't come to his country (Canada) without him making an appearance. He was re-signed and returned on the March 15, 2023 episode of Dynamite.

Professional wrestling style and persona
In Chikara, Stupefied based his gimmick, moveset, and attire around video games, more specifically games for the NES and SNES consoles. One of his trademarks was his tights, which had a pocket fashioned around an NES console on one side; for instance, if the Karate Kid game cartridge was inserted into the slot, he would start doing game-related mannerisms. In recent years, he has switched to regular tights.

Personal life
Dionne owns a small flooring company.

Championships and accomplishments

Alpha-1 Wrestling
A1 Tag Team Championship (2 times) – with Player Uno
Capital City Championship Combat
C4 Championship (1 time)
C4 Tag Team Championship]] (1 time) - with Thomas Dubois
Chikara
Campeonatos de Parejas (1 time) – with Player Uno
Chikara Young Lions Cup (1 time)
Young Lions Cup VII
Combat Revolution Wrestling
CRW Interim Tag Team Championship (1 time) – with Player Uno
Federation de Lutte Québécois
 FLQ Heavyweight Championship (2 times, current)
FLQ Heavyweight Championship Tournament (2016)
International Wrestling Syndicate
IWS World Tag Team Championship (1 time) – with Player Uno
Lucha Toronto
Royal Canadian Tag Team Championship (2 times) - with Evil Uno
North Shore Pro Wrestling
NSPW Tag Team Championships (2 times) - with Evil Uno
Pro Wrestling Guerrilla
PWG World Tag Team Championship (1 time) – with Player Uno
Dynamite Duumvirate Tag Team Title Tournament (2012) – with Player Uno
DDT4 (2012) - with Player Uno
 Pro Wrestling Illustrated
Ranked No. 191 of the top 500 singles wrestlers in the PWI 500 in 2021
Queen Street Entertainment
QSE Canadian Openweight Championship (1 time)
Smash Wrestling
F8tful Eight Tournament (2018) - with Player Uno 
SoCal Uncensored
Match of the Year (2012) with Player Uno vs. Future Shock (Adam Cole and Kyle O'Reilly) and The Young Bucks (Matt Jackson and Nick Jackson) on July 21
Tag Team of the Year (2012) – with Player Uno
Squared Circle Wrestling
2CW Tag Team Championship (1 time) – with Player Uno

References

External links

1989 births
All Elite Wrestling personnel
Canadian expatriate professional wrestlers in the United States
Canadian male professional wrestlers
Living people
Masked wrestlers
People from Victoriaville
Professional wrestlers from Quebec
The Dark Order members
21st-century professional wrestlers
PWG World Tag Team Champions